Edward Gregory may refer to:

Edward John Gregory (1850–1909), British painter
Edward Meeks Gregory (1922–1995), Episcopal priest in Richmond, Virginia
Ned Gregory (1839–1899), Australian cricketer
Eddie Gregory (born 1952), boxer
Ed Gregory (born 1931), basketball player

See also
Ted Gregory (born 1965), American football player